Matthieu Lo Ying Ping (born 3 August 1986) is a French badminton player. Born to a Chinese father and a French mother, He started playing badminton at aged 10 at the Union St Bruno Club in Bordeaux, 4 years later he joined Espoir de Talence Bordeaux and when he was 18 he joined the France national badminton team at INSEP. In 2005, he won bronze medal at the European Junior Badminton Championships in boys' doubles event.

Achievements

Mediterranean Games 
Men's singles

European Junior Championships 
Boys' doubles

BWF International Challenge/Series 
Men's singles

Men's doubles

  BWF International Challenge tournament
  BWF International Series tournament
  BWF Future Series tournament

References

External links 
 
 

1986 births
Living people
Sportspeople from Paris
French people of Chinese descent
French male badminton players
Mediterranean Games bronze medalists for France
Competitors at the 2013 Mediterranean Games
Mediterranean Games medalists in badminton